Delhi Public School, Patna or DPS Patna  is a school in Patna, Bihar, India. It was established in the year 1998 in collaboration with DPS Society and the Takshila Education Society. DPS, Patna is affiliated with the Central Board of Secondary Education, New Delhi. The motto of the school is "Service Before Self." DPS Patna features in the top 10 CBSE Schools of Patna. The school won the Green School Award for 2017–18". The annual theme for the session 2020–21 is "The Constitution of India".

Location

The school has 2 campuses in the city, junior wing in Priyadarshi Nagar, Bailey Road, Patna and the senior wing in Chandmari village, Danapur Cantonment. The path to the school (Senior Wing) has been currently closed due to protests from local farmers.It is selectively opens for school Buses only.

Cultural events organised by School 

The school hosts many cultural events under another organisation called "Spic Macay". These include the National School Intensive in December 2010, and "Ninad" in October 2011. The School also conducted seminars with well known experts under the name "Beyond Boundaries" in the time of COVID-19 lockdown. It has been uploaded on YouTube.

Important events at school 
Source:

Interschool events 
 Slam Dunk (Basketball Championship)
 Kick Off (Football Championship)
 Master Stroke (Chess Championship)
 Takshila Music and Dance Competition
 Top Spin (Table Tennis Championship)
 Takshila Hockey Championship
 Robofest (A championship in which children from different schools come and create robots)
 Take Off (Athletics Championship)
 CBSE Cluster

Intraschool Events 
 Annual Athletic Meet ( For class IV-XII ) (Annual Sports Tournament)
 Get Set Go ( For class Nursery-X) (Annual Sports Tournament)
 Annual Activities ( For class Nursery-III )
 Bal Sangham ( For class Nursery-V ) (Takes place on the occasion of Children's Day)
 Khoj – An event for students of class V, in which they spend one night at school with their friends and teachers.
 Rural Immersion Programme – An event for students of class XI. The students are taken to a village in Siwan, Bihar where the school has a living accommodation. The students spend one week with their friends and teachers there.

The school conducted "Open Mic" contest which was based on oratory skills. Children from DPS Ludhiana,DPS Coimbatore,DPS Pune participated along with students of DPS Patna.

Games and sports
Delhi Public School has many provisions for sports and games. It has a half Olympic-size swimming pool, a badminton arena, a lawn tennis hard court, a football pitch, a hockey ground, table tennis room and a basketball court. The School Has various sports clubs such as Football, Basketball etc. Although the school has so many arrangements for almost all kinds of sports, it lacks resources for one of the most evergreen sport which is cricket.

Online classes during pandemic
The school is conducting online classes using its student portal and "Google Meet". The school held admission tests and took various direct admission on the basis of Board Examination. Thus, a healthy migration of students from various schools was observed. The school has started conducting co-curricular periods like Health and Physical Education(H&PE) and Student Leadership and Life Skills program (SL&LSP), Music and Resource Center classes online too. The school has conducted Pre-Midterm, Midterm as well as the Annual exams too using its own testing software and it was MCQ based.

Notable alumni
 Tejashwi Yadav,  Deputy Chief Minister, Bihar.
 Ishan Kishan, Indian cricketer, Former Captain, India Under-19 Cricket Team Player, Gujarat Lions (2016–17), Mumbai Indians (2018–present)

Board exam results

Class 10

Class 12 
Source:

References

1998 establishments in Bihar
Delhi Public School Society
Educational institutions established in 1998
Schools in Patna